Charm School is a reality television series airing on VH1; it is a spin-off of Flavor of Love created by executive producers Cris Abrego and Mark Cronin. The first season, called Flavor of Love Girls: Charm School, is hosted by comedian Mo'Nique and features thirteen contestants from the first two seasons of Flavor of Love. The second season, called Rock of Love: Charm School, is hosted by Sharon Osbourne and features fourteen contestants from the first two seasons of Rock of Love with Bret Michaels. The third season, called Charm School with Ricki Lake, is hosted by Ricki Lake and features contestants from Rock of Love Bus with Bret Michaels and Real Chance of Love. The show ostensibly acts as a finishing school for its contestants that helps develop proper etiquette. Season 1 offered a prize of $50,000, while Seasons 2 and 3 doubled the amount to $100,000. All three seasons offered the title of "Charm School Queen."

Series overview

Flavor of Love Girls: Charm School
Flavor of Love Girls: Charm School was hosted by comedian Mo'Nique and featured 13 contestants from the first two seasons of Flavor of Love, who were assigned the challenge of developing proper etiquette in a competition for $50,000 and the title of "Charm School Queen." Mo'Nique was assisted by talent agency president Keith Lewis and magazine beauty director Mikki Taylor. The series first aired weekly from April 15, 2007 to July 8, 2007. Saaphyri was ultimately named "Charm School Queen" and was awarded the $50,000.

Rock of Love: Charm School
Rock of Love: Charm School was hosted by Sharon Osbourne and featured 14 contestants from the first two seasons of Rock of Love, who were assigned the challenge of developing proper etiquette in a competition for $100,000 and the title of "Charm School Queen." The series premiered on October 12, 2008, and the finale was aired on December 21, 2008. Brandi Mahon was ultimately named "Charm School Queen" and was awarded the $100,000.

Charm School with Ricki Lake
Charm School with Ricki Lake is hosted by Ricki Lake and features 14 contestants from Rock of Love Bus with Bret Michaels and Real Chance of Love, who learn self-improvement through selfless acts and charity work. The headmistress, Ricki Lake, is assisted by deans Alani "La La" Vazquez and Stryker. The series premiered on May 11, 2009, and the finale was aired on July 27, 2009. Ebony "Risky" Jones was ultimately named "Charm School Queen" and was awarded the $100,000.

References

External links

2000s American reality television series
2007 American television series debuts
2009 American television series endings
American television spin-offs
Reality television spin-offs
VH1 original programming
African-American reality television series
English-language television shows